Rasmus Asplund (born 3 December 1997) is a Swedish professional ice hockey forward for the Nashville Predators of the National Hockey League (NHL). He was drafted by the Buffalo Sabres in the second round (33rd overall) in the 2016 NHL Entry Draft.

Playing career
Asplund made his Swedish Hockey League debut playing with Färjestad BK during the 2014–15 SHL season.

Following his fourth SHL season, Asplund signed a three-year, entry-level contract with the Buffalo Sabres on 23 May 2018.

On 16 September 2020, with the North American set to be delayed due to the COVID-19 pandemic, Asplund remained in Sweden to begin playing on loan from the Sabres with Västerås IK of the HockeyAllsvenskan. He recorded 9 points through 14 games in the second tier Allsvenskan before ending his loan and returning to the Sabres.

Asplund was considered one of the top two-way forward prospects in the NHL following the 2021–22 season. Asplund posted strong defensive metrics on his way to finish in the top 20 for the 2021–22 Frank J. Selke Trophy awarded to the top defensive forward.

In the following 2022–23 season, Asplund in a reduced role due to the Sabres emerging forward depth was limited to just 27 regular season games, collecting two goals and eight points. At the NHL trade deadline, Asplund was traded by the Sabres to the Nashville Predators in exchange for a seventh-round draft pick in the 2024 NHL Entry Draft on 3 March 2023.

Career statistics

Regular season and playoffs

International

References

External links
 

1997 births
Living people
Buffalo Sabres draft picks
Buffalo Sabres players
Färjestad BK players
People from Filipstad
Nashville Predators players
Rochester Americans players
Sportspeople from Värmland County
Swedish ice hockey centres
VIK Västerås HK players